George Edward "Live Oak" Taylor (February 3, 1851 – February 19, 1888) was an American professional baseball outfielder. Most famous for serving as a substitute with the 1869 Cincinnati Red Stockings, baseball's first all-professional team, on their west coast road trip in the latter half of that season, he later went on to play three seasons in Major League Baseball.  He played 2 games in 1877 with the Hartford Dark Blues, 24 games in 1879 with the Troy Trojans, and 41 games in 1884 with the Pittsburgh Alleghenys.

Sources

Guschov, Stephen (1998). The Red Stockings of Cincinnati.  Jefferson, N. C.: McFarland & Co.

1851 births
1888 deaths
19th-century baseball players
Major League Baseball center fielders
Hartford Dark Blues players
Troy Trojans players
Pittsburgh Alleghenys players
San Francisco Athletics players
San Francisco (minor league baseball) players
Baseball players from Maine
People from Belfast, Maine
19th-century deaths from tuberculosis
Tuberculosis deaths in California